The Dunlop International was a golf tournament held in Australia and played annually from 1965 to 1972. Prize money in 1965 was A£4,000, A$8,000 in 1966 in 1967, A$15,000 in 1968 and A$25,000 from 1969 to 1972. A few weeks after the conclusion of the 1972 tournament, sponsors Dunlop announced that it would no longer be held.

It was noted as having one of the best fields for an Australian tournament during its era. The 1967 event was expected to have defending U.S. Open champion Jack Nicklaus, Tony Jacklin, Bob Charles, and defending British Open champion Roberto De Vicenzo. It was reported by the Canberra Times that, "With all the top Australians as well, it will be a world-class field."

Winners

In 1966 Stanton won at the second hole of a sudden-death playoff. In 1969 Devlin won at the first extra hole.

References

Golf tournaments in Australia
Recurring sporting events established in 1965
Recurring events disestablished in 1972
1965 establishments in Australia
1972 disestablishments in Australia